In the United States Senate, the nuclear option is a parliamentary procedure that allows the Senate to override a standing rule by a simple majority, avoiding the two-thirds supermajority normally required to invoke cloture on a resolution to amend Senate rules.

The nuclear option can be invoked by a senator raising a point of order that contravenes a standing rule. The presiding officer would then overrule the point of order based on Senate rules and precedents; this ruling would then be appealed and overturned by a simple majority vote (or a tie vote), establishing a new precedent. The nuclear option is made possible by the principle in Senate procedure that appeals from rulings of the chair on points of order relating to nondebatable questions are themselves nondebatable. Since cloture is a nondebatable question, the appeal is decided without debate. This obviates the usual requirement for a two-thirds majority to invoke cloture on a resolution amending the standing rules.

The nuclear option was invoked in November 2013, when a Senate Democratic majority led by Harry Reid used the procedure to eliminate the 60-vote rule for judicial nominations, other than nominations to the Supreme Court. In April 2017, the nuclear option was invoked again, this time by a Senate Republican majority led by Mitch McConnell to also eliminate the 60-vote rule for Supreme Court nominations and thereby end debate on the nomination of Neil Gorsuch. The use of the nuclear option on legislation to abolish the 60-vote threshold and overcome a filibuster has been proposed, but not enacted.

The term "nuclear option" is an analogy to nuclear weapons being the most extreme option in warfare.

Procedure to invoke the nuclear option
On November 21, 2013, following a failed cloture vote on a nomination under Rule XXII, the nuclear option was invoked, as follows:

Mr. REID. I raise a point of order that the vote on cloture under Rule XXII for all nominations other than for the Supreme Court of the United States is by majority vote.
The PRESIDENT pro tempore. Under the rules, the point of order is not sustained.
Mr. REID. I appeal the ruling of the Chair and ask for the yeas and nays.
(48–52 vote on upholding ruling of the chair)
The PRESIDENT pro tempore. The decision of the Chair is not sustained.
The PRESIDENT pro tempore. *** Under the precedent set by the Senate today, November 21, 2013, the threshold for cloture on nominations, not including those to the Supreme Court of the United States, is now a majority. That is the ruling of the Chair.

Once the presiding officer rules on the point of order, the appeal is decided by a simple majority vote and without any debate. The procedure may, for example, override requirements of Rule XXII, which requires three-fifths of senators to vote to close debate, thereby ending a filibuster for legislation or two-thirds of senators present and voting for amending a Senate rule. As there is no debate, there is no requirement for these supermajority voting requirements to apply. The presiding officer and the standing rule is therefore overruled by a simple majority.

This procedure establishes a new precedent by allowing for cloture to be invoked by a simple majority on certain questions. These and other Senate precedents will then be relied upon by future Senate Parliamentarians in advising the chair, in the above example effectively eliminating the 60-vote barrier going forward.

Background

The 60-vote rule

In 1806, the Senate changed the rules to remove the restriction on the total time allowed for debate. In 1917, Rule XXII was amended to allow for ending debate (invoking "cloture") with a two-thirds majority, later reduced in 1975 to three-fifths of all senators duly chosen and sworn (usually 60). Thus, although a bill might have majority support, opposition from or absence by at least 41 senators can effectively defeat the bill by preventing a closure of debate and final vote, in a tactic known as a filibuster.

Since the 1970s, the Senate has also used a "two-track" procedure whereby Senate business may continue on other topics while one item is being filibustered. Since filibusters no longer required the minority to actually hold the floor and bring all other business to a halt, the mere threat of a filibuster has gradually become normalized. In the modern Senate, this means that most measures now typically requires 60 votes to advance, unless a specific exception limiting the time for debate applies.

Changing Rule XXII to eliminate the 60-vote rule is made difficult by the rules themselves. Rule XXII, paragraph 2 states that to end debate on any proposal "to amend the Senate rules ... the necessary affirmative vote shall be two-thirds of the Senators present and voting." If all senators are present and voting, 67 votes are required to amend the rule.

Validity
The validity of the nuclear option has been challenged. For example, then-Senate Parliamentarian Alan Frumin expressed opposition to the nuclear option in 2005. Successive Congressional Research Service reports have made it clear that the use of the nuclear option would by itself "involve violations of Senate rules and practices already in existence". However, its validity has not been seriously challenged since being invoked by both parties in 2013 and 2017, at least with regard to invoking cloture on judicial nominations by simple majority vote.

Terminology
Republican Party Senator Ted Stevens suggested using a ruling of the chair to defeat a filibuster of judicial nominees in February 2003. The code word for the plan was "Hulk". Weeks later, Senator Trent Lott coined the term nuclear option in March 2003 because the maneuver was seen as a last resort with possibly major consequences for both sides. The metaphor of a nuclear strike refers to the majority party unilaterally imposing a change to the filibuster rule, which might provoke retaliation by the minority party.

The alternative term "constitutional option" is often used with particular regard to confirmation of executive and judicial nominations, on the rationale that the United States Constitution requires these nominations to receive the "advice and consent" of the Senate. Proponents of this term argue that the Constitution implies that the Senate can act by a majority vote unless the Constitution itself requires a supermajority, as it does for certain measures such as the ratification of treaties. By effectively requiring a supermajority of the Senate to fulfill this function, proponents believe that the current Senate practice prevents the body from exercising its constitutional mandate, and that the remedy is therefore the "constitutional option".

History

Senate rules before 1917

The first set of Senate rules included a procedure to limit debate called "moving the previous question." This rule was dropped in 1806 in the misunderstanding that it was redundant. Starting in 1837, senators began taking advantage of this gap in the rules by giving lengthy speeches so as to prevent specific measures they opposed from being voted on, a procedure called filibustering.

In 1890, Republican Senator Nelson Aldrich threatened to break a Democratic filibuster of a Federal Election Bill (which would ban any prohibitions on the black vote) by invoking a procedure called "appeal from the chair." At this time, there was no cloture rule or other regular method to force an immediate vote. Aldrich's plan was to demand an immediate vote by making a point of order. If, as expected, the presiding officer overrules the point, Aldrich would then appeal the ruling and the appeal would be decided by a majority vote of the Senate. If a majority voted to limit debate, a precedent would have been established to allow debate to be limited by majority vote. Aldrich's plan was procedurally similar to the modern option. In the end, the Democrats were able to muster a majority to table the bill, so neither Aldrich's proposed point of order nor his proposed appeal was ever actually moved.

Early cloture era, 19171974
The history of the constitutional option can be traced to a 1917 opinion by Senator Thomas J. Walsh (Democrat of Montana). Walsh contended that the Constitution provided the basis by which a newly commenced Senate could disregard procedural rules established by previous Senates, and had the right to choose its own procedural rules based on a simple majority vote despite the two-thirds requirement in the rules. "When the Constitution says, 'Each House may determine its rules of proceedings,' it means that each House may, by a majority vote, a quorum present, determine its rules," Walsh told the Senate. Opponents countered that Walsh's option would lead to procedural chaos, but his argument was a key factor in the adoption of the first cloture rule later that year.

In 1957, Vice President Richard Nixon (and thus President of the Senate) wrote an advisory opinion that no Senate may constitutionally enact a rule that deprives a future Senate of the right to approve its own rules by the vote of a simple majority. Nixon made clear that he was speaking for himself only, not making a formal ruling. Nixon's opinion, along with similar opinions by Vice Presidents Hubert Humphrey and Nelson Rockefeller, has been cited as precedent to support the view that the Senate may amend its rules at the beginning of the session with a simple majority vote. At the opening of the 85th United States Congress in January 1957, Clinton P. Anderson attempted to use Nixon's opinion to invoke the nuclear option but was interrupted by Lyndon B. Johnson, who as Senate Majority Leader had precedence. Johnson replaced Anderson's motion with his own, more oblique motion to table the question, which defeated the nuclear option.

The option was moved by Democratic Party Senators Clinton P. Anderson (1953, 1955, 1957, 1963), George McGovern (1967), and Frank Church (1969), but was defeated or tabled by the Senate each time.

60-vote rule takes hold, 19752004
A series of votes in 1975 have been cited as a precedent for the nuclear option, although some of these were reconsidered shortly thereafter. According to one account, the option was arguably endorsed by the Senate three times in 1975 during a debate concerning the cloture requirement. A compromise was reached to reduce the cloture requirement from two-thirds of those voting (67 votes if 100 Senators were present) to three-fifths of the current Senate (60 votes if there were no current vacancies) and also to approve a point of order revoking the earlier three votes in which the constitutional option had been invoked. This was an effort to reverse the precedent that had been set for cloture by majority vote.

Senator Robert Byrd was later able to effect changes in Senate procedures by majority vote four times when he was majority leader without the support of two-thirds of senators present and voting (which would have been necessary to invoke cloture on a motion for an amendment to the Rules): to restrict post-cloture filibusters (1977), to adopt a rule to limit amendments to an appropriations bill (1979), to allow a senator to make a non-debatable motion to bring a nomination to the floor (1980), and to ban filibustering during a roll call vote (1987). However, none of these procedural changes affected the ultimate ability of a 41-vote minority to block final action on a matter before the Senate.

2005 debate on judicial nominations

The maneuver was brought to prominence in 2005 when Majority Leader Bill Frist (Republican of Tennessee) threatened its use to end Democratic-led filibusters of judicial nominees submitted by President George W. Bush. In response to this threat, Democrats threatened to shut down the Senate and prevent consideration of all routine and legislative Senate business. The ultimate confrontation was prevented by the Gang of 14, a group of seven Democratic and seven Republican Senators, all of whom agreed to oppose the nuclear option and oppose filibusters of judicial nominees, except in extraordinary circumstances. Several of the blocked nominees were brought to the floor, voted upon and approved as specified in the agreement, and others were dropped and did not come up for a vote, as implied by the agreement.

Rules reforms, 2011 and 2013
In 2011, with a Democratic majority in the Senate (but not a supermajority), Senators Jeff Merkley and Tom Udall proposed "a sweeping filibuster reform package" to be implemented via the constitutional option but Majority Leader Harry Reid dissuaded them from pushing it forward. In October 2011, however, Reid triggered a more modest change in Senate precedents. In a 51–48 vote, the Senate prohibited any motion to waive the rules after a filibuster is defeated, although this change did not affect the ultimate ability of a 41-vote minority to block final action via a filibuster.

The nuclear option was raised again following the congressional elections of 2012, this time with Senate Democrats in the majority (but short of a supermajority). The Democrats had been the majority party in the Senate since 2007  but only briefly did they have the 60 votes necessary to halt a filibuster. The Hill reported that Democrats would "likely" use the nuclear option in January 2013 to effect filibuster reform, but the two parties managed to negotiate two packages of amendments to Senate rules concerning filibusters that passed on January 24, 2013, by votes of 78 to 16 and 86 to 9, thus avoiding the need for the nuclear option.

In the end, negotiation between the two parties resulted in two packages of "modest" amendments to the rules on filibusters that were approved by the Senate on January 24, 2013, without triggering the nuclear option. Changes to the standing orders affecting just the 2013-14 Congress were passed by a vote of 78 to 16, eliminating the minority party's right to filibuster a bill as long as each party has been permitted to present at least two amendments to the bill. Changes to the permanent Senate rules were passed by a vote of 86 to 9.

In July 2013, the nuclear option was raised as nominations were being blocked by Senate Republicans as Senate Democrats prepared to push through a change to the chamber's filibuster rule. On July 16, the Senate Democratic majority came within hours of using the nuclear option to win confirmation of seven of President Obama's long-delayed executive branch appointments. The confrontation was avoided when the White House withdrew two of the nominations in exchange for the other five being brought to the floor for a vote, where they were confirmed.

Use in 2013 and 2017

2013: Nominations except Supreme Court
On November 21, 2013, the Democratic-majority Senate voted 52–48, with the exception of all Republicans and three Democrats who voted against sustaining the decision of the chair (Carl Levin of Michigan, Joe Manchin of West Virginia and Mark Pryor of Arkansas), to set a precedent that "the vote on cloture under Rule XXII for all nominations other than for the Supreme Court of the United States is by majority vote," even though the text of the rule requires "three-fifths of the senators duly chosen and sworn" to end debate. This ruling's precedent eliminated the 60-vote requirement to end a filibuster against executive branch nominees and judicial nominees other than to the Supreme Court. The text of Rule XXII was never changed. A three-fifths supermajority was still required to invoke cloture on other questions such as legislation and Supreme Court nominees.

Rationale for change
The Democrats' stated motivation for this change was expansion of filibustering by Republicans during the Obama administration, in particular blocking three nominations to the United States Court of Appeals for the District of Columbia Circuit. Republicans had asserted that the D.C. Circuit was underworked, and also cited the need for cost reduction by reducing the number of judges in that circuit. At the time of the vote, 59 executive branch nominees and 17 judicial nominees were awaiting confirmation.

Prior to November 21, 2013, there had been only 168 cloture motions filed (or reconsidered) with regard to nominations. Nearly half of them (82) had been during the Obama administration, but those cloture motions were often filed merely to speed things along, rather than in response to any filibuster. In contrast, there were just 38 cloture motions on nominations during the preceding eight years under President George W. Bush. Most of those cloture votes successfully ended debate, and therefore most of those nominees cleared the hurdle. Obama won Senate confirmation for 30 out of 42 federal appeals court nominations, compared with Bush's 35 out of 52.

Regarding Obama's federal district court nominations, the Senate approved 143 out of 173 as of November 2013, compared to George W. Bush's first term 170 of 179, Bill Clinton's first term 170 of 198, and George H.W. Bush's 150 of 195. Filibusters were used on 20 Obama nominations to U.S. District Court positions, but Republicans had allowed confirmation of 19 out of the 20 before the nuclear option was invoked.

2017: Supreme Court nominations
On April 6, 2017, the Republican-majority Senate invoked the nuclear option and voted 52–48 along partisan lines to remove the Supreme Court exception created in 2013 by voting against the decision of the chair, who had reaffirmed that the 2013 changes to Rule XXII did not apply to Supreme Court nominees. This established a new precedent which effectively allowed the motion on cloture regarding Supreme Court nominations to pass with a simple majority vote. The vote came after Senate Democrats filibustered the nomination of Neil Gorsuch to the Supreme Court of the United States and after the Senate Republicans had previously refused to take up Merrick Garland's nomination by President Obama in 2016.

Proposed use for legislation
Following elimination of the 60-vote rule for nominations in 2013, senators expressed concerns that the 60-vote rule will eventually be eliminated for legislation via the nuclear option.

While president, Donald Trump spoke out against the 60-vote requirement for legislation on several occasions. Then-Senate Majority Leader Mitch McConnell opposed abolishing the filibuster despite Trump's demands, and in April 2017, 61 senators (32 Republicans, 28 Democrats, and one independent) signed a letter stating their opposition to abolishing the filibuster for legislation. On January 21, 2018, Trump said on Twitter that if the shutdown stalemate continued, Republicans should consider the "nuclear option" in the Senate. He repeated the call on December 21, 2018, with a fresh shutdown looming.

, the nuclear option has not been used to abolish the filibuster on legislation. As with Senate confirmations, to abolish the filibuster would require a vote of at least 51 senators, or 50 senators if the tie-breaker vote of the vice president (as president of the Senate) also votes in favor.

Concerns about abolishing the filibuster through the nuclear option were reiterated in 2021 as the Democratic-majority Senate could move to eliminate the filibuster through the nuclear option. On January 3, 2022, Senate Majority Leader Chuck Schumer announced that the Senate would vote on the nuclear option to change filibuster rules to pass his party's election reform legislation. The bid failed on January 19, 2022, after Schumer said he could only get 48 votes from his party due to holdout Senators Joe Manchin and Kyrsten Sinema.

Policy arguments

Issues
Policy debates surrounding the nuclear option – a tool to implement a rule change – are closely related to arguments regarding the 60-vote requirement imposed by Rule XXII. Issues include:

whether a simple majority of the Senate should be able to confirm a judicial nominee or pass a bill;
whether a three-fifths vote (60/100) should be required for cloture, as required by Rule XXII;
whether the rule should differ for nominations vs. legislation; and
whether the Constitution mandates either threshold.

Constitutional provisions
The U.S. Constitution does not explicitly address how many votes are required for passage of a bill or confirmation of a nominee. Regarding nominations, Article II, Section 2, of the U.S. Constitution says the president "shall nominate, and by and with the Advice and Consent of the Senate, shall appoint ... Judges...." The Constitution includes several explicit supermajority rules, including requiring a two-thirds majority in the Senate for impeachment, confirming treaties, overturning a veto, expelling one of its members, and concurring in the proposal of Constitutional Amendments.

Arguments for simple majority

Constitutional argument
Supporters of a simple majority standard argue that the Constitution's silence implies that a simple majority is sufficient; they contrast this with Article II's language for Senate confirmation of treaties. Regarding nominations, they argue that the Appointments Clause's lack of a supermajority requirement is evidence that the Framers consciously rejected such a requirement. They also argue that the general rule of parliamentary systems "is that majorities govern in a legislative body, unless another rule is expressly provided."

From this, supporters argue that a simple-majority rule would bring current practices into line with the Framers' original intent – hence supporters' preferred nomenclature of the "constitutional option". They argue that the filibuster of presidential nominees effectively establishes a 60-vote threshold for approval of judicial nominees instead of the 51-vote standard implied by the Constitution. A number of existing Judges and Justices were confirmed with fewer than sixty votes, including Supreme Court Justice Clarence Thomas (confirmed in a 52–48 vote in 1991).

Obstruction
Supporters have claimed that the minority party is engaged in obstruction. In 2005, Republicans argued that Democrats obstructed the approval of the president's nominees in violation of the intent of the U.S. Constitution. President Bush had nominated forty-six candidates to federal appeals courts. Thirty-six were confirmed. 10 were blocked and 7 were renominated in Spring 2005. Democrats responded that 63 of President Clinton's 248 nominees were blocked via procedural means at the committee level, denying them a confirmation vote and leaving the positions available for Bush to fill.

Majority rule
In 2005, pro-nuclear option Republicans argued that they had won recent elections and in a democracy the winners rule, not the minority. They also argued that while the Constitution requires supermajorities for some purposes (such as 2/3 needed to ratify a treaty), the Founders did not require a supermajority for confirmations, and that the Constitution thus presupposes a majority vote for confirmations.

Arguments for 60-vote rule

Constitutional arguments
Proponents of the 60-vote rule point out that while the Constitution requires two-thirds majorities for actions such as treaty ratification and proposed constitutional amendments, it is silent on other matters. Instead, Article I, Section V of the Constitution permits and mandates that each house of Congress establish its own rules. Regarding nominations, they contend that the word "Advice" in the Constitution refers to consultation between the Senate and the President with regard to the use of the President's power to make nominations.

Tradition
Supporters of the right to filibuster argue that the Senate has a long tradition of requiring broad support to do business, due in part to the threat of the filibuster, and that this protects the minority. Starting with the first Senate in 1789, the rules left no room for a filibuster; a simple majority could move to bring the matter to a vote. However, in 1806, the rule allowing a majority to bring the previous question ceased to exist. The filibuster became possible, and since any Senator could now block a vote, 100% support was required to bring the matter to a vote. A rule change in 1917 introduced cloture, permitting a two-thirds majority of those present to end debate, and a further change in 1975 reduced the cloture requirement to three-fifths of the entire Senate.

Majority rule
Proponents of the 60-vote rule have argued that the Senate is a less-than-democratic body that could conceivably allow a simple majority of senators, representing a minority of the national population, to enact legislation or confirm appointees lacking popular support.

Ensuring broad support
In 2005, Democrats claimed the nuclear option was an attempt by Senate Republicans to hand confirmation power to themselves. Rather than require the President to nominate someone who will get broad support in the Senate, the nuclear option would allow Judges to not only be "nominated to the Court by a Republican president, but also be confirmed by only Republican Senators in party-line votes."

Of the nine U.S. Supreme Court Justices seated between August 3, 1994, and May 2005, six were confirmed with the support of ninety or more Senators, two were confirmed with at least the support of sixty senators, and only one (Clarence Thomas) was confirmed with the support of fewer than sixty Senators. However, since John G. Roberts was confirmed, no candidate has received more than 68 votes. Conservative nominees for Appellate Courts that were given a vote through the "Gang of 14" were confirmed almost exclusively along party lines: Priscilla Owen was confirmed 55–43, Janice Rogers Brown was confirmed 56–43, and William Pryor was confirmed 53–45.

Public opinion
In 2005, polling indicated public support for an active Senate role in its "advise and consent" capacity. An Associated Press-Ipsos poll released May 20, 2005, found 78 percent of Americans believe the Senate should take an "assertive role" examining judicial nominees rather than just give the president the benefit of the doubt.

The agreement to stave off the "nuclear option" reached by fourteen moderate Senators supports a strong interpretation of "Advice and Consent" from the Constitution:

Other uses of "nuclear option"
Beyond the specific context of U.S. federal judicial appointments, the term "nuclear option" has come to be used generically for a procedural maneuver with potentially serious consequences, to be used as a last resort to overcome political opposition. In a 2005 legal ruling on the validity of the Hunting Act 2004 the UK House of Lords used "nuclear option" to describe the events of 1832, when the then-government threatened to create hundreds of new Whig peers to force the Tory-dominated Lords to accept the Reform Act 1832. (Nuclear weapons were not theorized until the 20th century, so the government's threat was not labeled as "nuclear" at the time.)

The term is also used in connection with procedural maneuvers in various state senates.

The nuclear option is not to be confused with reconciliation, which allows issues related to the annual budget to be decided by a majority vote without the possibility of filibuster.

See also
United States federal judge
Judicial appointment history for United States federal courts
Cloture
George W. Bush judicial appointment controversies
George W. Bush Supreme Court candidates
Reconciliation (United States Congress)
Up or down vote

Notes

References

External links

Supportive of nuclear option
M. Gold & D. Gupta, The Constitutional Option to Change Senate Rules and Procedures: a Majoritarian Means to Overcome the Filibuster in the Harvard Journal of Law and Public Policy; 28 Harvard Journal of Law & Public Policy 205 (2004) (arguing that the nuclear/constitutional option it is firmly grounded in Senate history) (PDF file)
William G. Dauster, “The Senate in Transition or How I Learned To Stop Worrying and Love the Nuclear Option,” N.Y.U. Journal of Legislation & Public Policy, volume 19 (number 4) (December 2016): pages 631–83 (explaining Senator Reid's use of the nuclear option).
Policy Analysis by Senate Republican Policy Committee summarizing arguments and reviewing history
National Review's Bench Memos
Senator George Allen (R-VA) Calls Democrats Bluff

Opposed to nuclear option
Center for American Progress: Nuclear Option Resource Guide
CivilRights.org: a coalition representing 180 national organizations
Home Page for Senate Democratic Leader Harry Reid (D-Nev)
Independent Judiciary
Senator Reid's Letter to Bill Frist
Washington Post article on Republican's 1968 Fortas filibuster
Hatching a New Filibuster Precedent: The Senator from Utah's Revisionist history John Dean writes for FindLaw arguing that Orrin Hatch has attempted to mischaracterize the Abe Fortas nomination filibuster.
Revenge of the Frist
MoveOn.org Emergency Petition to Save the Courts
Myth and fact sheets
Filibustering the Truth

Other
David Law & Lawrence B. Solum, "Judicial Selection, Appointments Gridlock, and the Nuclear Option," (April 14, 2006).
History of U.S. House Committee on Rules
History of U.S. Senate Committee on Rules and Administration
[ Standing Rules of The Senate]
TIME: The Filibuster Formula
Politics and justice for all: Court nomination fights predate Bork, Thomas

2005 in American politics
Parliamentary procedure
Terminology of the United States Senate
Filibuster